Eric Sorensen is a Canadian television journalist. He has been the national affairs correspondent for Global National since early 2014, and previously served as Washington, D.C. bureau chief for Global National, from November 2006 to 2014. Sorensen was previously a reporter for CBC Television's The National from 1992 until joining Global News in 2006.

Born in Hearst, Ontario and raised in Port Colborne, Ontario, He began his broadcasting career in 1973 after graduating from the Ryerson Polytechnical Institute radio and television arts program. He worked for a variety of television and radio stations across Canada before joining the CBC's national news division, and was the first Canadian to receive the Benton Fellowship in Broadcast Journalism from the University of Chicago in 1984.

References

External links 
 Eric Sorenson biography - Global News

Canadian television reporters and correspondents
Year of birth missing (living people)
Living people
Toronto Metropolitan University alumni
University of Chicago alumni
Canadian people of Danish descent
Global Television Network people
People from Hearst, Ontario
People from Port Colborne